Ogartowo  (German Jagertow) is a village in the administrative district of Gmina Połczyn-Zdrój, within Świdwin County, West Pomeranian Voivodeship, in north-western Poland.

See also

 History of Pomerania

References

See also
 Ogartowo in Germany

Ogartowo